Parvattus is a monotypic genus of Chinese jumping spiders containing the single species, Parvattus zhui. It was first described by J. X. Zhang & Wayne Paul Maddison in 2012, and is only found in China.

References

Monotypic Salticidae genera
Salticidae
Spiders of China